The Port of Gwangyang() is a port in South Korea, located in the city of Gwangyang, South Jeolla Province.

References

Gwangyang